Stictiella formosa is a species in the order Hymenoptera ("ants, bees, wasps and sawflies"), in the class Insecta ("insects").
The distribution range of Stictiella formosa includes Central America and North America.

References

Further reading
 

Crabronidae
Insects described in 1873